This is a list of airports in Kyrgyzstan, sorted by location.



Airports 

Airport names shown in bold indicate the airport has scheduled service on commercial airlines. Out of 86 airports, aerodromes and landing strips ever built in Kyrgyzstan, only the ones with functioning runways are listed below.

See also 
 Transport in Kyrgyzstan
 List of airports by ICAO code: U#UA - Kazakhstan, Kyrgyzstan
 Wikipedia:WikiProject Aviation/Airline destination lists: Asia#Kyrgyzstan

References 
 
  – includes IATA codes
 Great Circle Mapper: Airports in Kyrgyzstan – IATA and ICAO codes
 World Aero Data: Kyrgyzstan – ICAO codes and coordinates

 
Kyrgyzstan
Airports
Airports
Kyrgyzstan